Region VIII (Spanish: Región VIII. Naucalpan) is an intrastate region within the State of Mexico.  It borders Mexico City to the northwest in the Valley of Mexico, and the entire region is part of Metropolitan Area of the Valley of Mexico but the two least populated cities are left out of the Mexico City Metropolitan Area (see Greater Mexico City).  It comprises five cities: Huixquilucan,
Isidro Fabela, 
Jilotzingo,
Naucalpan de Juárez,
and Nicolás Romero.

References

Regions of the State of Mexico